WXRW-LP (104.1 FM), branded as "Riverwest Radio", is a non-commercial low-power FM radio station licensed to Milwaukee, Wisconsin. The station is licensed to Riverwest Artists Association, Inc.

The station airs a community-oriented, mostly talk-based format. All shows are local, aside from the syndicated Democracy Now.

History
After several years as an online webcaster, WXRW-LP debuted on the airwaves on January 1, 2016.

References

External links
Riverwest Radio

XRW-LP
XRW-LP
Community radio stations in the United States